Oshor Joseph Williams (born 21 April 1958) is an English former footballer in the English Football League who now works for the PFA as a union learning representative. During his playing days he played both in midfielder and in attack. During his career he took part in two successful Fourth Division promotion campaigns.

He started his career as a youth team player at Middlesbrough, before joining Manchester United in 1976. Failing to make the first team, he joined non-league Billingham Synthonia and then Gateshead, before returning to the professional game with Southampton in 1978. A year later he signed for Stockport County, where his career really took off. Five years he spent with Stockport, making close to 200 league appearances. He then spent two years at Port Vale and then Preston North End. In 1989, he left the professional game permanently, joining non-league Lancaster City. He signed with Winsford United in 1993 and then Hyde United a year later. He retired as a player in 1995.

Career

Early career
Born and raised in Stockton-on-Tees, County Durham, Williams joined his local league club Middlesbrough as a schoolboy in 1972, signing apprentice forms with the club once he had turned 15. However, when "Boro" decided not to offer Williams a professional contract in August 1976, he was immediately offered a second chance by Manchester United. Williams spent 12 months at Old Trafford before they in turn decided to release him.

Upon his release from United, Williams returned to the North East and had spells with both Billingham Synthonia and Gateshead before he was spotted by a scout from Southampton, who offered him a trial with the club in March 1978.

Southampton
After impressing manager Lawrie McMenemy, Williams signed professional forms with the Dell club after they secured his services for a £4,000 fee. After just a handful of reserve team outings, he was loaned out to basement club Exeter City for the start of the 1978–79 season. In his month at St James Park, Williams made two appearances, scoring once, before returning to the Saints. He made his debut on 3 March 1979, taking Terry Curran's place at outside left at home to Arsenal against England international full-back Kenny Sansom. Despite showing plenty of natural ball control, his final touch was lacking, and he made only three further starts, plus two substitute appearances, before he was given a free transfer to Stockport County in September 1979.

Stockport County
It was at County that Williams found his feet, becoming a favourite with the Stockport fans. A quick winger with an eye for goal, Williams was at his most dangerous with the ball at his feet attacking the opposition full back. He acted as the captain whenever skipper Tommy Sword was unavailable. In four-and-a-half seasons at Edgeley Park, Williams played 216 games in all competitions, scoring 31 goals, before being surprisingly sold to Port Vale for £7,000 in November 1984. Under Jimmy McGuigan's stewardship, the "Hatters" struggled in the lower half of the Fourth Division table in 1979–80, 1980–81, and 1981–82. Their form improved slightly under new boss Eric Webster in the 1982–83 and 1983–84 campaigns.

Port Vale
His first season at Vale Park saw him make 22 appearances, scoring two goals. He cracked his left kneecap in a training accident in February 1985, but recovered his first team place on his recovery two months later. His second season with the club saw Williams win his first promotion, when John Rudge's "Valiants" were promoted to the Third Division in 1986. Soon, though, after 62 games and seven goals for Vale, troubled Preston North End came calling, and after agreeing a bargain £2,000 fee in August 1986. Having recently refused new terms with the Vale, the move came as little surprise to observers of the game.

Preston North End
Manager John McGrath immediately installed Williams as captain. He made his debut on 26 August, and scored on his home debut at Deepdale the following week in a 2–1 victory over Swansea City. Preston stormed to promotion at the end of the 1986–87 season; Williams missed three months with injury but scored 14 goals in 36 games, with four of his goals coming in braces against former clubs Stockport and Exeter. The next two seasons, however, were almost a washout, with injury restricting Williams to just a handful of games. At the end of the 1988–89 season, Williams decided to call it a day from playing full-time and started work behind the scenes at Deepdale, both as a coach and in the commercial department. Nevertheless, Williams still turned out part-time for Lancaster City in the Northern Premier League.

Later career
Upon leaving Lancaster at the end of the 1990–91 season, Williams moved onto Winsford United. He started five games and made three substitute appearances for Conference club Witton Albion in the 1993–94 season. He signed for Northern Premier League Premier Division side Hyde United for the 1994–95 season. He played 29 games and scored once during his time at Ewen Fields, helping the "Tigers" to a fourth-place finish and qualification to the First Round of the FA Cup, with his goal coming as a last-minute equaliser to take the FA Cup Second Round qualification match at Colwyn Bay to a replay.

Post-retirement
It was after leaving Hyde that Williams studied at the University of Salford for his BA in politics and history. He later worked as a sports studies lecturer at Trafford College. He joined the coaching staff at Aberdeen in February 2003, and remained at Pittodrie until he was sacked alongside manager Steve Paterson in May 2004.

Williams now works for the PFA education service, where he is on hand to offer help and advice to footballers past and present in their efforts to gain qualifications for life after football. Williams also coached the under-16s at Wigan Athletic's Centre of Excellence.

Career statistics
Source:

Honours
Preston North End
 Football League Fourth Division second-place promotion: 1986–87

Port Vale
 Football League Fourth Division fourth-place promotion: 1985–86

References

1958 births
Living people
Footballers from Stockton-on-Tees
Footballers from County Durham
Black British sportspeople
English footballers
Association football midfielders
Association football forwards
Middlesbrough F.C. players
Manchester United F.C. players
Billingham Synthonia F.C. players
Gateshead F.C. players
Southampton F.C. players
Exeter City F.C. players
Stockport County F.C. players
Port Vale F.C. players
Preston North End F.C. players
Lancaster City F.C. players
Winsford United F.C. players
Witton Albion F.C. players
Hyde United F.C. players
English Football League players
National League (English football) players
Northern Premier League players
Alumni of the University of Salford
Association football coaches
Preston North End F.C. non-playing staff
Aberdeen F.C. non-playing staff
Wigan Athletic F.C. non-playing staff
Presidents of the General Federation of Trade Unions (UK)